On Dal (died 590), commonly referred to by Koreans as "On Dal the Brave" (yong-gamhan ondal (용감한 온달)), was a Goguryeo General and the husband of Princess Pyeonggang.

A legend tells that his was unusually tall, his face was handsome, and he had a good heart. His family was poor, so he begged for his mother. Though of middle-class origin, he later married King Pyeongwon of Goguryeo's daughter Princess Pyeonggang and then become a general. He died bravely leading the Goguryeo garrison in 590 at Achasanseong Fortress during a battle against the Silla army.

In popular culture
 Portrayed by Ji Hyun-woo in the 2009 KBS2 TV series Invincible Lee Pyung Kang.
 Portrayed by Lee Jong-hyun in the 2017 Netflix TV series My Only Love Song.
 Portrayed by  Na In-woo in the 2021 KBS2 series River Where the Moon Rises.

See also
Princess Pyeonggang
Pyeongwon of Goguryeo

References

590 deaths
Goguryeo people
Year of birth unknown